, also known as Daisuke-han (ダイスケはん), is the harsh vocalist of the Japanese band Maximum the Hormone, while fellow band member Ryo Kawakita does most of the clean voices. He was born in Takamatsu, Kagawa.

General information
Daisuke was, along with Nao, one of the founding members of Maximum the Hormone. Daisuke used to perform all of the central vocals, but now splits the role with guitarist/vocalist Ryo.

While not recording and touring, Daisuke hosts the weekly Maximum the Hormone radio show, along with Nao.

Cited Influences
The Stalin
The Star Club
Pantera
Green Day
Lip Cream
Slayer

References

1977 births
Living people
Musicians from Hachiōji, Tokyo
Musicians from Kagawa Prefecture
Japanese heavy metal singers
Nu metal singers
21st-century Japanese singers
People from Takamatsu, Kagawa